Head cheese may  refer to:

 Head cheese, also known as brawn, a terrine usually made from the head of a pig or calf and set in aspic
 A slang term for smegma in many English speaking countries
 A short-lived professional wrestling tag team between Al Snow and Steve Blackman
 The original name for 1974's The Texas Chain Saw Massacre